The BlackBerry Q5 is the third BlackBerry 10 smartphone, unveiled at the BlackBerry Live 2013 Keynote on May 14, 2013. BlackBerry 10 is gesture based.

The Q5 is targeted largely at emerging markets because of its lower end specifications. It is available in black, white, red, pink and grey. Like the BlackBerry Q10, it has a QWERTY keyboard.

Features 
While typing, there is the option to type using the keyboard on the touchscreen.  The keyboard has more space between the individual keys allowing for ease of typing.  The touchscreen is small in size with a high resolution allowing the user to be able to read and view images with ease.  However, the camera on the device is only five megapixels, which was below the norm at the time, being eight megapixels.

Exclusive features include BlackBerry Hub, which allows users to view email, messages, and social network updates with a swipe to the side while using any application. Time Shift Mode creates perfect photos by taking multiple photos and this allows the user to isolate a single part of the photo and move it.

Availability
The BlackBerry Q5 was first available in the United Arab Emirates and later in India and Canada. The target regions for this product are Europe, the Middle East, Africa, Asia and Latin America. India is the first country in Asia Pacific where this product was launched. In 2014, BlackBerry had a large portion of the smartphone market in India.

Model comparison

See also 
BlackBerry 10
List of BlackBerry 10 devices

References

External links 
 

Q5
Mobile phones introduced in 2013
Mobile phones with an integrated hardware keyboard
Discontinued smartphones